Peter Harry Winn (born 19 December 1988) is an English semi-professional footballer who plays for Barton Town. He started his career at Scunthorpe United, making his first-team debut at the age of 16 whilst a second-year scholar. He was loaned out to Northwich Victoria and Barrow respectively towards the latter stages of the 2008–09 season. Winn joined Conference Premier club Gateshead the following season, initially on a two-month loan deal, before extending the agreement until the end of the season.

On his return to Scunthorpe, Winn was released, and subsequently signed for League Two club Stevenage in 2010. In his first season with Stevenage, Winn helped the club earn promotion to League One in May 2011. The following season, Winn was loaned to Conference Premier clubs Cambridge United and Grimsby Town. He was released by Stevenage in May 2012, and joined Macclesfield Town of the Conference Premier a month later.

After two years at Macclesfield, Winn signed for divisional rivals Chester in July 2014, where he spent the 2014–15 season. In July 2015, Winn joined his hometown club, Cleethorpes Town of the Northern Counties East Premier Division, and won the Northern Counties East League Cup in his first season there. During the 2016–17 season, Winn helped the club to Northern Counties East Premier Division and Lincolnshire Senior Trophy titles, whilst also finishing runner-up in the FA Vase. After three years at Cleethorpes, Winn joined Grimsby Borough of Northern Counties East Division One in July 2018, with the club winning the league title during his one season there. He subsequently signed for divisional rivals Barton Town in July 2019.

Career

Scunthorpe United
Winn began his career in the youth system at Scunthorpe United, and was named as the club's Young Player of the Year for the 2006–07 season. He initially played as a goalkeeper when he first joined the club's youth set-up, later being deployed as a left winger from the age of 14 onwards. He made his debut for Scunthorpe at the age of 17 while a second-year scholar at the club, starting in a 2–1 victory over Bradford City in the Football League Trophy in October 2006. He also made an appearance as a second-half substitute in the same competition in the next round against Port Vale, with Scunthorpe losing the tie 5–3 on a penalty shoot-out, drawing 0–0 after extra-time. The following season, Winn made four first-team appearances for the club, all of which came in Scunthorpe's league campaign. During the early stages of the 2008–09 season, Mansfield Town registered transfer interest in Winn, hoping to sign him on loan. No loan agreement to Mansfield materialised and, later that month, he joined Northwich Victoria on loan from October 2008 until January 2009. He played nine games and scored one goal, in a 1–1 draw against Salisbury City on 21 November 2008. He had a trial at York City in February, playing in a reserve team game against Grimsby Town, although no transfer materialised. Winn joined Barrow on an emergency one-month loan in February 2009, where he played three times before returning to his parent club.

During the 2009–10 season, Winn signed for Conference Premier club Gateshead on an agreement loan on 16 October 2009. He scored on his debut, in Gateshead's 1–0 victory against Salisbury City on 31 October 2009. In his second appearance for the club, he scored the equalising goal in an FA Cup tie against League One club Brentford, taking the game to a replay at Griffin Park. His loan spell initially ended in December 2009, but he rejoined Gateshead on loan until the end of the season in February 2010. His last goal for the club came in a 3–1 victory over Forest Green Rovers as Gateshead narrowly avoided relegation. He played 27 times for the club during his two loan spells, scoring five times. Winn was subsequently released by Scunthorpe at the end of the 2009–10 season, and was offered a contract by Gateshead shortly after.

Stevenage
Winn rejected the contract offer from Gateshead and instead joined League Two club Stevenage on a one-year contract on 27 May 2010. After the transfer had been completed, Winn stated that he had sent Stevenage manager Graham Westley a letter prior to moving to the club requesting a trial with the club. On his move to the club, Winn stated "it's a good feeling having signed for Stevenage as I wanted to play in the Football League again next season and I've now got the chance". Winn made his debut for Stevenage in the club's 2–2 draw against Macclesfield Town on 7 August 2010. He scored his first goal for the club in Stevenage's 3–1 FA Cup win over Newcastle United in January 2011. Winn scored Stevenage's third goal of the game in injury-time to seal the victory, describing the goal as the "biggest moment of his career". He scored his first league goal for Stevenage in a 3–0 victory against Rotherham United on 25 January 2011. Winn was sent-off for the first time in his career in a match against Southend United on 22 April 2011, after a challenge on Southend defender Sean Clohessy. He returned to the first-team a month later, on 20 May 2011, in the play-off semi-final second leg against Accrington Stanley, coming on as an 89th-minute substitute in a 1–0 victory. Winn was an unused substitute in the 2011 Football League Two play-off Final eight days later, a 1–0 win against Torquay United, thus earning Stevenage promotion to League One. Winn made 33 appearances for Stevenage during the 2010–11 season, scoring three goals.

At the start of the 2011–12 season, Winn was used as Stevenage's substitute goalkeeper after Chris Day dislocated his finger in pre-season. He warmed up ahead of each match alongside Alan Julian, and was listed as Stevenage's second-choice goalkeeper. Winn made one substitute appearance during the first six games of the campaign, and was subsequently loaned out to Conference Premier club Cambridge United on a three-month loan agreement. After the loan move was finalised, Winn stated that he had nearly joined Cambridge United ahead of the 2011–12 season, but the deal had ultimately not gone through. Winn made his debut for Cambridge in a 1–0 away win at Newport County on 3 September 2011, playing 71 minutes of the match. He went on to make 13 appearances for the club, scoring once in a 2–0 home victory against Ebbsfleet United on 20 September 2011. Winn returned to Stevenage when his 93-day loan deal expired on 1 December 2011, with Cambridge manager Jez George stating the club would consider a permanent transfer in the 2012 January transfer window. No transfer to Cambridge materialised, and, in March 2012, Winn joined Conference Premier club Grimsby Town on loan until the end of the 2011–12 season, where he made 10 appearances. He left Stevenage when his contract expired in May 2012.

Macclesfield Town
A month after being released by Stevenage, Winn signed for Conference Premier club Macclesfield Town on a free transfer. He signed a two-year contract with the club. Winn made his debut for Macclesfield in the club's first game of the 2012–13 season, playing the whole match in a 2–1 away defeat to Hereford United. With Macclesfield trailing 1–0 in a home match against Luton Town on 19 February 2013, Winn was forced to play 68 minutes as a goalkeeper after Rhys Taylor was sent-off for fouling Luton striker Andre Gray. He kept a clean sheet during the remainder of the match, as Macclesfield came back to draw 1–1. Winn made 34 appearances for Macclesfield during his first season with the club. He remained at Macclesfield for the 2013–14 season, scoring his only goal for the club in a 4–0 victory over League One opponents Swindon Town in the FA Cup on 9 November 2013. He made 41 appearances during the season.

Chester
Winn signed for fellow Conference Premier club Chester upon the expiry of his contract on 25 June 2014. He made his Chester debut in the club's first game of the 2014–15 season, a 5–0 home defeat to Barnet on 9 August 2014. He scored his first goal for Chester three days later, a late consolation in a 2–1 defeat to Forest Green Rovers. Having played 12 times for Chester during the first half of the season due to injury, Winn was loaned out to Northern Premier League club King's Lynn Town in January 2015 on an initial one-month loan, a deal that was later extended to three months. He made 12 appearances at King's Lynn, scoring twice, including once in a 3–1 victory against Trafford, a result that ultimately secured King's Lynn's survival in the Premier Division. He was recalled by his parent club on 8 April 2015, and ended the season by coming on as a substitute in Chester's final two league matches, both of which were victories. Winn left Chester at the end of the season having made 15 appearances for the club.

Non-League
Winn signed for his hometown club, Cleethorpes Town of the Northern Counties East Premier Division, on 3 July 2015. He made over 40 appearances in his first season with the club as they won the Northern Counties East League Cup title. During the 2016–17 season, his second season with Cleethorpes, he played regularly as they won the Northern Counties East Premier Division title, amassing 108pts. The club won the Lincolnshire Senior Trophy during the season. Cleethorpes also reached the FA Vase final that season, losing 4–0 to South Shields in the final at Wembley Stadium on 21 May 2017, with Winn playing the whole match.

He spent three years at Cleethorpes before joining Northern Counties East Division One club Grimsby Borough in July 2018. Winn made his Grimsby Borough debut in a 0–0 draw at home to Shirebrook Town on 4 August 2018, before scoring his first goal for the club four days later in a 10–0 victory against FC Bolsover. The club won the Division One title in Winn's first year with the club, overtaking league leaders Campion by beating them 4–2 on the final day of the season. He made 33 appearances during the season, scoring four times.

Winn signed for divisional rivals Barton Town on 5 July 2019. He made his Barton debut in the club's first victory of the 2019–20 season, playing the whole match in a 3–2 win over Carlton Town in the FA Cup extra preliminary round on 10 August 2019.

Style of play
Winn has predominantly been deployed as a winger throughout his career. He has adapted to play as a full-back for both Cleethorpes Town and Grimsby Borough in recent seasons.

Career statistics

A.  The "Other" column constitutes appearances and goals (including those as a substitute) in the Football League Trophy, FA Trophy, Lincolnshire Senior Trophy, NCEL League Cup and play-offs.

Honours
Stevenage
 League Two play-offs: 2010–11

Cleethorpes Town
 Northern Counties East League Cup: 2015–16
 Northern Counties East Premier Division: 2016–17
 Lincolnshire Senior Trophy: 2016–17
 FA Vase runner-up: 2016–17

Grimsby Borough
 Northern Counties East Division One: 2018–19
 Lincolnshire Senior Trophy runner-up: 2018–19

References

External links

1988 births
Living people
People from Cleethorpes
English footballers
Association football forwards
Scunthorpe United F.C. players
Northwich Victoria F.C. players
Barrow A.F.C. players
Gateshead F.C. players
Stevenage F.C. players
Cambridge United F.C. players
Grimsby Town F.C. players
Macclesfield Town F.C. players
Chester F.C. players
King's Lynn Town F.C. players
Cleethorpes Town F.C. players
Grimsby Borough F.C. players
Barton Town F.C. players
English Football League players
National League (English football) players